The Crawlers may refer to:
"The Crawlers" (short story), by Philip K. Dick
The Crawlers (film), a 1990 Italian horror film also known as Troll 3

See also
 Crawler (disambiguation)